Jeremiah Ryan (30 July 1891 – 3 March 1960) was an Irish Fine Gael politician. He served as the vice-commandant of the mid-Tipperary bridge of the IRA. A farmer, he was first elected to Dáil Éireann as a Teachta Dála (TD) for the Tipperary constituency at the 1937 general election. He was re-elected at the 1938 and 1943 general elections. He did not contest the 1944 general election. He was elected to the 6th Seanad on the Administrative Panel in 1948.

References

1891 births
1960 deaths
Fine Gael TDs
Members of the 9th Dáil
Members of the 10th Dáil
Members of the 11th Dáil
Members of the 6th Seanad
Politicians from County Tipperary
Irish farmers
Fine Gael senators